= Infobank (magazine) =

Indonesian banking magazine

- Editor-in-chief: Eko B. Supriyanto
- Categories: Banking
- Frequency: Monthly
- First issue: January 1979
- Company: PT. Infoarta Pratama
- Country: Indonesia
- Based in: Jakarta
- Language: Indonesian
- Website: www.infobanknews.com
- ISSN: 0126-4915

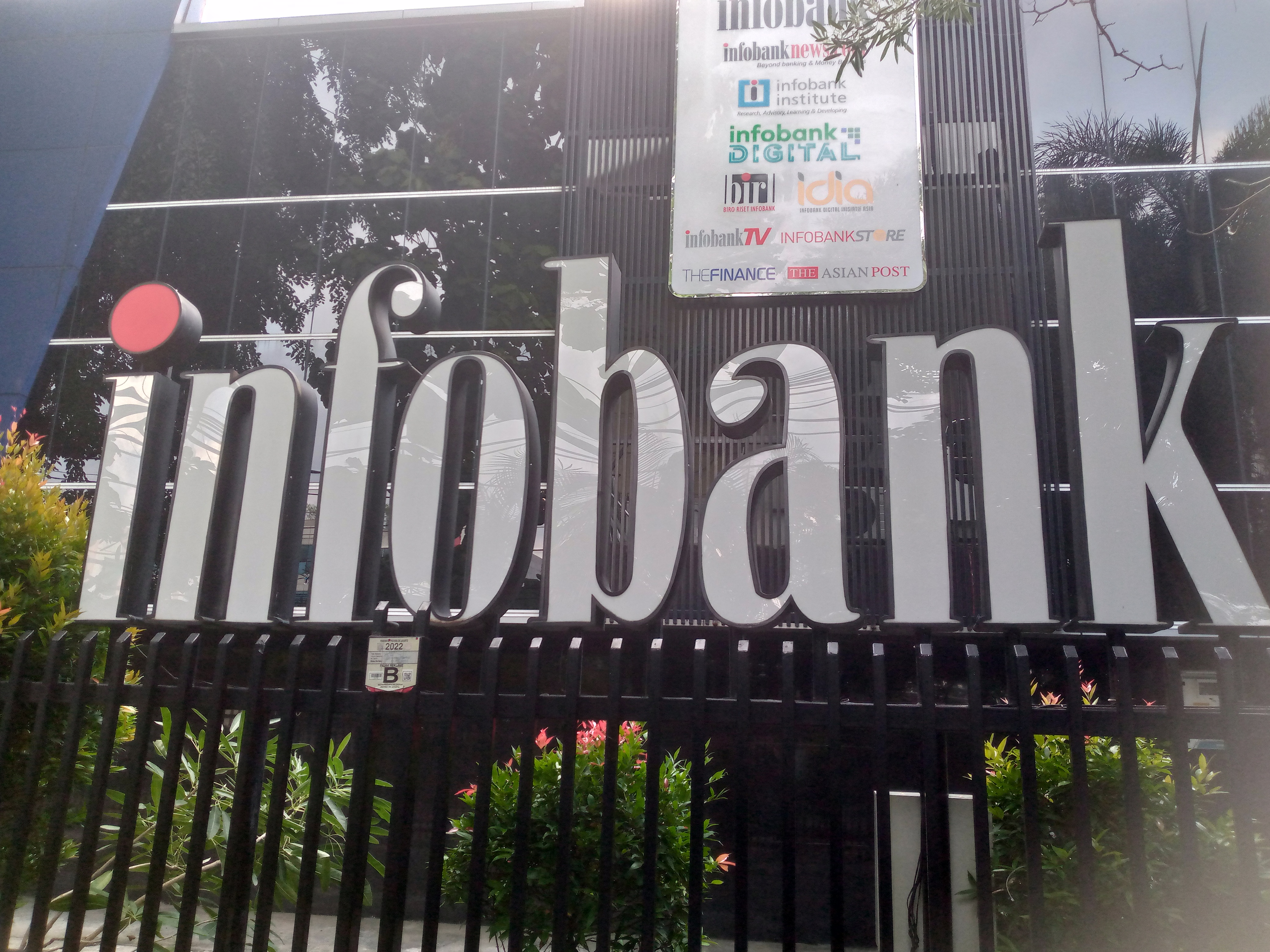

Infobank (stylized in all lowercase) was an Indonesian monthly banking and business magazine.

== History ==
It was first published in January 1979.

Infobank provided articles on banking and business and is published on a monthly basis.
